Mariño Municipality may refer to:

 Santiago Mariño Municipality
 Mariño Municipality, Nueva Esparta
 Mariño Municipality, Sucre

Municipality name disambiguation pages